Welkenbach is an Ortsgemeinde – a community belonging to a Verbandsgemeinde – in the Westerwaldkreis in Rhineland-Palatinate, Germany.

Geography

The community lies in the Westerwald between Limburg an der Lahn and Siegen. Verbandsgemeinde of Hachenburg, a kind of collective municipality. Its seat is in the like-named town.

History
In 1315, Welkenbach had its first documentary mention as Welkemerode.

Politics

The municipal council is made up of 7 council members, including the extraofficial mayor (Bürgermeister), who were elected in a majority vote in a municipal election on 13 June 2004.

Economy and infrastructure

The community lies west of Bundesstraße 8, leading from Limburg an der Lahn nach Siegburg. The nearest Autobahn interchanges are in Dierdorf and Neuwied on the A 3 (Cologne–Frankfurt). The nearest InterCityExpress stop is the railway station at Montabaur on the Cologne-Frankfurt high-speed rail line.

References

External links
 Welkenbach in the collective municipality’s Web pages 

Westerwaldkreis